Communauté d'agglomération Montargoise et Rives du Loing is the communauté d'agglomération, an intercommunal structure, centred on the town of Montargis. It is located in the Loiret department, in the Centre-Val de Loire region, central France. Created in 2002, its seat is in Montargis. Its area is 231.2 km2. Its population was 62,517 in 2019, of which 14,976 in Montargis proper.

Composition
The communauté d'agglomération consists of the following 15 communes:

Amilly
Cepoy
Châlette-sur-Loing
Chevillon-sur-Huillard
Conflans-sur-Loing
Corquilleroy
Lombreuil
Montargis
Mormant-sur-Vernisson
Pannes
Paucourt
Saint-Maurice-sur-Fessard
Solterre
Villemandeur
Vimory

References

Montargoise
Montargoise